Colin Gordon was a British actor.

Colin Gordon can also refer to:

Colin Gordon (athlete), Jamaican high jumper
Colin Gordon (footballer), English footballer and sports agent
Colin Gordon (cricketer), Jamaican cricketer